Re London Wine Shippers [1986] PCC 121 is an English trusts law case, concerning the necessity of ascertaining assets subject to a trust. It has been distinguished by Hunter v Moss, and Re Harvard Securities Ltd, and may not be consistent with the general policy of insolvency law as seen in Re Lehman Brothers International (Europe).

Facts
Unsecured creditors of a bankrupt wine trading company, London Wine Shippers Ltd, argued that they should be able to claim the bottles of wine they had paid for. The fine wine company had gone into receivership, and the remaining wine stock was a valuable asset. The bottles that the customers had bought had not yet been individually identified. The company had not even promised to provide wine from its current stocks.

Judgment
Oliver J held that even if the company had said the wine was to come from current stocks, the trust would in any event have been uncertain. There could be no award for specific performance because the Sale of Goods Act required similarly that any goods be ascertained. In the course of his judgment, Oliver J said as follows.

Any alleged constructive or express trust of 50 bottles because the subject matter of the trust would be uncertain, at least until 50 specific bottles were set aside for the customers.

See also

English trust law

Notes

References

English trusts case law